Spatalistis dulcedana is a species of moth of the family Tortricidae. It is found in Vietnam.

References

Moths described in 1992
dulcedana
Moths of Asia